The Water Act 2003 (c 37) is an Act of the Parliament of the United Kingdom.

The report Taking Water Responsibly, published in March 1999, was a precursor of this Act.

Part 1

Section 1 - Licences to abstract water
This section came into force on 1 April 2006. Section 1(1) inserted section 24A of the Water Resources Act 1991.

Section 2 - Restrictions on impounding
This section came into force on 1 April 2006. Section 2(2) substituted new sections 25(1) and (1A) for section 25(1) of the Water Resources Act 1991. Section 2(5) inserted section 25(9) of the Water Resources Act 1991. Section 2(7) substituted section 64(1)(b) of the Water Resources Act 1991.

Section 3 - Existing impounding works
This section came into force on 1 April 2006. The words "the appropriate agency" were substituted for "the Environment Agency" and "the Agency", in each place where they occurred, by article 4(1) of, and paragraph 415 of, of Schedule 2 to the Natural Resources Body for Wales (Functions) Order 2013 (SI 2013/755) (W 90).

The following orders have been made under section 3(5):
The Water Resources (Abstraction and Impounding) Regulations 2006
The Isles of Scilly (Application of Water Legislation) Order 2020 (SI 2020/214)

Section 3(13) inserted section 114(2)(a)(ix) of the Environment Act 1995.

Section 4 - Existing impounding works: works notices
This section came into force on 1 April 2006. The words "the appropriate agency" were substituted for "the Agency", in each place where it occurred, by article 4(1) of, and paragraph 416(3) of Schedule 2 to, the Natural Resources Body for Wales (Functions) Order 2013.

The words "appropriate agency's" were substituted for the words "Environment Agency's" in the opening words of section 4(1) by article 4(1) of, and paragraph 416(2) of that Schedule 2 to, the Natural Resources Body for Wales (Functions) Order 2013. The words "appropriate agency" were substituted for "Environment Agency" in section 4(2)(a) by article 4(1) of, and paragraph 416(4) of Schedule 2 to, the Natural Resources Body for Wales (Functions) Order 2013. In section 4(5), the words "on summary conviction, or on conviction on indictment, to a fine" were substituted for the words following "liable" by article 4(1) of, and paragraph 34 of Schedule 4 to, the Legal Aid, Sentencing and Punishment of Offenders Act 2012 (Fines on Summary Conviction) Regulations 2015 (SI 2015/664).

Section 5 - Rights of navigation, harbour and conservancy authorities
This section substituted section 26 of the Water Resources Act 1991. This section came into force on 1 January 2018.

Section 7
The words "appropriate agency" were substituted for "Agency", in each place where it occurred in section 7(3), by article 4(1) of, and paragraph 417(2)(a) of Schedule 2 to, the Natural Resources Body for Wales (Functions) Order 2013. The words "appropriate agency's" in section 7(3) were substituted for "Agency's" by article 4(1) of, and paragraph 417(2)(b) of Schedule 2 to, the Natural Resources Body for Wales (Functions) Order 2013.

Section 10
The words "appropriate agency" were substituted for "Agency" in section 10(5)(c) by article 4(1) of, and paragraph 418 of Schedule 2 to, the Natural Resources Body for Wales (Functions) Order 2013.

Section 27
The words "appropriate agency" were substituted for "Environment Agency" in section 27(1)(a) by article 4(1) of, and paragraph 419 of Schedule 2 to, the Natural Resources Body for Wales (Functions) Order 2013.

Section 33
The words "appropriate agency" were substituted for "Agency" in section 33(3)(a) by article 4(1) of, and paragraph 420(2) of Schedule 2 to, the Natural Resources Body for Wales (Functions) Order 2013.

The words "or of the Natural Resources Body for Wales, whether framed by reference to the appropriate agency or otherwise," were inserted after the words "Environment Agency" in section 33(5) by article 4(1) of, and paragraph 420(3)(a) of Schedule 2 to, the Natural Resources Body for Wales (Functions) Order 2013. The words "or, as the case may be, the Natural Resources Body for Wales,'" were inserted after the words "the Agency's" by article 4(1) of, and paragraph 420(3)(b) of Schedule 2 to, the Natural Resources Body for Wales (Functions) Order 2013.

Part 2

Section 39
The word "EU" was substituted for the word "Community" in the term "Community obligation" in section 39(9) by article 6(1)(e) of Treaty of Lisbon (Changes in Terminology) Order 2011 (SI 2011/1043).

Section 40
This section will be repealed when paragraph 132 of Schedule 7 to the Water Act 2014 comes into force.

Section 52
As to the effect of this section, see paragraph 3(d) of Schedule 2 to the Water Act 2014 (Commencement No. 6, Transitional Provisions and Savings) Order 2016 (SI 2016/465) (C 26)

The word "and" at the end of section 52(1)(c) was repealed by article 4(1) of, and paragraph 421(2)(a) of Schedule 2 to, the Natural Resources Body for Wales (Functions) Order 2013. Section 52(1)(ca) was inserted by article 4(1) of, and paragraph 421(2)(b) of Schedule 2 to, the Natural Resources Body for Wales (Functions) Order 2013.

Section 52(3)(c) was substituted by article 4(1) of, and paragraph 421(3) of Schedule 2 to, the Natural Resources Body for Wales (Functions) Order 2013.

The words ", water supply licensees and sewerage licensees" were substituted for "and licensed water suppliers" in section 52(3)(a) by section 56 of, and paragraph 133(2)(a) of Schedule 7 to, the Water Act 2014. The words "water supply licensees" were substituted for "licensed water suppliers" in section 52(3)(b) by section 56 of, and paragraph 133(2)(b) of Schedule 7 to, the Water Act 2014. The words ", water supply licensees and sewerage licensees" were substituted for "and licensed water suppliers" in section 52(3)(c) by section 56 of, and paragraph 133(2)(c) of Schedule 7 to, the Water Act 2014.

Section 52(9) was inserted by section 56 of, and paragraph 133(3) of Schedule 7 to, the Water Act 2014.

Part 3

Section 57
Section 57(7) was repealed by article 4(3) of, and paragraph 101(2) of Schedule 4 to, the Legal Aid, Sentencing and Punishment of Offenders Act 2012 (Fines on Summary Conviction) Regulations 2015.

Section 58
As to the effect of this section, see paragraph 3(d) of Schedule 2 to the Water Act 2014 (Commencement No. 6, Transitional Provisions and Savings) Order 2016.

The words "water supply licensee" were substituted for the words "licensed water supplier" in the inserted sections 87(2)(b) and (3)(b) of the Water Industry Act 1991 in section 58(2) of the Water Act 2003, by section 56 of, and paragraph 134(2)(a) of Schedule 7 to, the Water Act 2014. The words "water supply licensee" were substituted for the words "licensed water supplier" in the inserted section 87C(4)(b) of the Water Industry Act 1991 in section 58(2) of the Water Act 2003, by section 56 of, and paragraph 134(2)(b) of Schedule 7 to, the Water Act 2014.

The words "water supply licensee" were substituted for the words "licensed water supplier" in the inserted section 90(2) of the Water Industry Act 1991 in section 58(6) of the Water Act 2003, by section 56 of, and paragraph 134(3)(a) of Schedule 7 to, the Water Act 2014. The words "the licensee" were substituted for the word "it", in both places, in the inserted section 90(2) of the Water Industry Act 1991 in section 58(6) of the Water Act 2003, by section 56 of, and paragraph 134(3)(b) of Schedule 7 to, the Water Act 2014.

Section 60
This section was repealed by article 4(3) of, and paragraph 101(3) of Schedule 4 to, the Legal Aid, Sentencing and Punishment of Offenders Act 2012 (Fines on Summary Conviction) Regulations 2015.

Section 61
This section was repealed by article 4(3) of, and paragraph 101(4) of Schedule 4 to, the Legal Aid, Sentencing and Punishment of Offenders Act 2012 (Fines on Summary Conviction) Regulations 2015.

Part 4

Section 102
The words "appropriate agency" were substituted for "Agency", in each place where it occurred, by article 4(1) of, and paragraph 422 of Schedule 2 to, the Natural Resources Body for Wales (Functions) Order 2013.

As to the application of section 102(3) see paragraphs 2(2), 3(2) and (3), 6(1) and (2), and 7 of Schedule 1 to the Water Act 2003 (Commencement No. 4, Transitional Provisions and Savings) Order 2005 (SI 2005/968) (C 43).

Section 103
The words "appropriate agency" were substituted for "Environment Agency", in each place where it occurred, by article 4(1) of, and paragraph 423 of Schedule 2 to, the Natural Resources Body for Wales (Functions) Order 2013.

Regulation 6 of the Water Supply (Water Quality) Regulations 2001 (Amendment) Regulations 2007 (SI 2007/3374) (W 299) was made under section 103 of the Water Act 2003.

The following regulations were made under section 103(1):
The Water Act 2003 (Consequential and Supplementary Provisions) Regulations 2005 (SI 2005/2035)
Regulation 7 of the Water Supply (Water Quality) Regulations 2000 (Amendment) Regulations 2007 (SI 2007/2734)

The Water Act 2014 (Consequential Amendments etc.) Order 2017 (SI 2017/506) was made under sections 103(1)(a) and (2) of the Water Act 2003.

The Unfair Terms in Consumer Contracts (Amendment) and Water Act 2003 (Transitional Provision) Regulations 2006 (SI 2006/523) were made under sections 103(1)(b) and (2)(b) of the Water Act 2003.

Section 105 - Interpretation, commencement, short title, and extent
Sections 21, 39(2) and (5) and 40 of the Water Industry Act 1991 are specified for the purposes of section 102(5)(b) of the Water Act 2003.

Section 105(2)(ba) was inserted by article 4(1) of, and paragraph 424 of Schedule 2 to, the Natural Resources Body for Wales (Functions) Order 2013.

The following orders have been made under section 105:
The Water Act 2003 (Commencement No. 1 and Transitional Provisions) Order 2004 (S.I. 2004/641 (C. 24))
The Water Act 2003 (Commencement No. 2, Transitional Provisions and Savings) Order 2004 (S.I. 2004/2528 (C. 106))
The Water Act 2003 (Commencement No. 3) (England) Order 2005 (S.I. 2005/344 (C. 12))
The Water Act 2003 (Commencement No. 4, Transitional Provisions and Savings) Order 2005 (S.I. 2005/968 (C. 43))
The Water Act 2003 (Commencement No. 5, Transitional Provisions and Savings) Order 2005 (S.I. 2005/2714 (C. 109))
The Water Act 2003 (Commencement No. 6, Transitional Provisions and Savings) Order 2006 (S.I. 2006/984 (C. 30))
The Water Act 2003 (Commencement No. 7 and Transitional Provisions) Order 2007 (S.I. 2007/1021 (C. 42))
The Water Act 2003 (Commencement No. 8) Order 2008 (S.I. 2008/1922 (C. 37))
The Water Act 2003 (Commencement No. 9 and Saving Provisions) (England) Order 2009 (S.I. 2009/359 (C. 17))
The Water Act 2003 (Commencement No. 10) Order 2010 (S.I. 2010/975 (C. 65))
The Water Act 2003 (Commencement No. 11) Order 2012 (SI 2012/264) (C 8)
The Water Act 2003 (Commencement No. 12) Order 2017 (SI 2017/1043) (C 96)
The Water Act 2003 (Commencement) (Wales) Order 2004 (S.I. 2004/910 (W. 93) (C. 39))
The Water Act 2003 (Commencement No. 2) (Wales) Order 2004 (S.I. 2004/2916 (W. 255) (C. 120))
The Water Act 2003 (Commencement No. 3) (Wales) Order 2012 (SI 2012/284) (W 48) (C 9)
The Water Act 2003 (Commencement No. 4) (Wales) Order 2017 (SI 2017/88) (W 32) (C 9)

Schedule 1
Paragraph 11 of the Schedule 1A to be inserted in the Water Industry Act 1991 was repealed by sections 105(1) and (2) of, and paragraph 172 of Schedule 11 to, and Schedule 12 to, the Natural Environment and Rural Communities Act 2006.

Schedule 7
Paragraph 22 was repealed by Part 1A of Schedule 27 to the Equality Act 2010, as inserted by article 3(3)(a) of, and Schedule 3 to, the Equality Act 2010 (Public Authorities and Consequential and Supplementary Amendments) Order 2011 (SI 2011/1060).

Paragraph 33 was repealed by section 91(1) of, and paragraph 170 of Schedule 12 to, the Postal Services Act 2011.

References
Halsbury's Statutes,

External links
The Water Act 2003, as amended from the National Archives.
The Water Act 2003, as originally enacted from the National Archives.
Explanatory notes to the Water Act 2003.

United Kingdom Acts of Parliament 2003
Environmental law in the United Kingdom